Senator Tyson may refer to:

Caryn Tyson (born 1963), Kansas State Senate
Jacob Tyson (1773–1848), New York State Senate
Lawrence Tyson (1861–1929), U.S. Senator from Tennessee